Oleksandr Zayets (23 March 1962 – 29 April 2007) was a Soviet/Ukrainian striker.

Career
In 1990 Zayets earned the bronze medals of the Soviet First League when, while playing for FC Metalurh Zaporizhzhia, he earned a promotion to the Soviet Top League. During the 1992 season Zayets placed fourth among the Ukrainian Premier League goal scorers. Between 1986 and 1991, he played 221 games For Metalurh Zaporizhzhia, scoring 46 times. In 2007 Zayets died in a fire in Zaporizhzhia.

Career statistics

Club

References

External links
 
 

1962 births
2007 deaths
People from Tokmak
Ukrainian footballers
Ukrainian Premier League players
Soviet Top League players
FC Metalist Kharkiv players
FC Metalurh Zaporizhzhia players
FC Torpedo Zaporizhzhia players
FC Oleksandriya players
SC Olkom Melitopol players
Ukrainian Cup top scorers
Deaths from fire
Accidental deaths in Ukraine
Association football forwards
Sportspeople from Zaporizhzhia Oblast